A Poet from the Sea is a 1927 Chinese silent film written and directed by Hou Yao, starring himself as a quixotic poet who tried to escape from the constraints of modernity. Filmed in Stanley, Hong Kong, it contains one of the earliest footages of Hong Kong. Like most Chinese silent films, it features both Chinese and English intertitles.

A fragment of the film was recovered in Europe and is currently stored in Italy's Cineteca di Bologna.

Cast
Hou Yao as Meng Ih Bing, a poet
Lee Dan Dan as Liu Tsan Ying, a girl woodcutter
S.D. Dju as Liu Yung, Liu Tsan Ying's younger brother
Xing Banmei as Ms. Yang, Liu Tsan Ying's mother
Lim Cho Cho as Yin Meizhen, Meng Ih Bing's cousin
Mi Tsong as Ting Bung, Meng's neighbor and a farmer
Sing Yee as Chang Tien Pao, a local bully
S.M. Ying as Tsian Er, Chang Tien Pao's subordinate
Huang Guanqun as Yang Yi, fisherman
Ge Cihong as Shi Shaoqiu, a general's son
Ou Xizhang as Guo Yongnian, a wealthy playboy
Zhang Qilong as Wen Yuyuan, a journalist
Xin Xin as Jin Dayou, a banker

References

Chinese silent films
Films shot in Hong Kong
Films about poets
Chinese romance films
Films directed by Hou Yao
Chinese black-and-white films
1920s romance films